The western terrestrial garter snake (Thamnophis elegans) is a western North American species of colubrid snake. At least five subspecies are currently recognized.

Description
Most western terrestrial garter snakes have a yellow, light orange, or white dorsal stripe, accompanied by two stripes of the same color, one on each side. Some varieties have red or black spots between the dorsal stripe and the side stripes. It is an immensely variable species, and even the most experienced herpetologists have trouble when it comes to identification. They are medium-sized snakes, usually .

Like many species of North American garter snake, the western terrestrial garter snake possesses a mildly venomous saliva. Specimens collected from Idaho and Washington produced venom with myonecrotic (muscle tissue-killing) effects when injected into the gastrocnemius muscles of mice. Several cases of mild human envenomation with local edema and other symptoms (but without any systemic symptoms) have occurred from the wandering garter snake subspecies, including in Colorado.

This species is the only garter snake species with a well-documented tendency to constrict prey, although the constriction is inefficient when compared with the constriction of many other snakes (such as the gopher snake), involving disorganized, loose, and sometimes unstable coils and a longer time required to kill prey. Snakes from Colorado populations of terrestrial garter snakes appear to be more efficient at killing their prey by constriction than those from Pacific Coast populations.

Geographic range
Thamnophis elegans is found in central British Columbia, central Alberta, and southwestern Manitoba in Canada. It can be found in the western United States, as far east as western Nebraska and the Oklahoma Panhandle. An isolated population occurs in Baja California, Mexico.

Subspecies

Six subspecies have been identified, although the validity of some of them is debated.
Thamnophis elegans arizonae Tanner & Lowe, 1989 – Arizona garter snake
Thamnophis elegans elegans (Baird & Girard, 1853) – mountain garter snake 
Thamnophis elegans hueyi Van Denburgh & Slevin, 1923 – San Pedro Mártir garter snake
Thamnophis elegans terrestris  Fox, 1951 – coastal garter snake 
Thamnophis elegans vagrans  (Baird & Girard, 1853) – wandering garter snake 
Thamnophis elegans vascotanneri  Tanner & Lowe, 1989 – Upper Basin garter snake

Habitat
It is primarily terrestrial, although populations in the Great Basin and Rocky Mountains are semi-aquatic.

Reproduction
The western terrestrial garter snake does not lay eggs, but instead is ovoviviparous, which is characteristic of natricine snakes. Broods of eight to 12 young are born in August and September.

Diet

The diet of Thamnophis elegans relies heavily on the prey available in the environment, and thus varies due to geographical differences. This makes the western terrestrial garter snake an excellent example of polyphagism. There are two main variants that are most prevalent: coastal and inland. Since coastal  T. elegans is found along the West Coast of the United States, it is found near the coast of the Pacific Ocean. On the other hand, if the snake population is considered to be inland, it is found near inland water sources such as streams, ponds, or lakes.

Coastal populations' food sources mainly include terrestrial prey such as slugs, salamanders, small mammals, and lizards. In contrast, inland populations indulge in a semi-aquatic diet containing frog and toad larvae, leeches, and fish. Thus, aquatic food sources are a staple in the inland snake populations' diet.

Coastal snakes are less likely to respond to chemical cues received from fish, which can be inferred by less rapid tongue-flicking when around them. They are also less likely to attack and ingest fish. This preference in diet is so strong that the snake will starve before eating non-preferred prey types. Further, this appears to be genetically determined as this variation in diet is observed in newborn snakes from both populations. 
When hunting, the Western Garter Snake's actions are chemically and visually mediated on land and in water. Regardless the habitat in which foraging takes place, both ecotypes utilize similar techniques. This consists of attacks that are both aerial and underwater. These include craning, cruising, and diving. However, coastal snakes are less likely to participate these activities.

These differences in diet and foraging behavior between coastal and inland snake populations suggest that the species has undergone microevolution. Due to dietary and foraging differences between variants of T. elegans, it can be inferred that coastal populations have filled a niche in the environment that allows them to no longer rely on fish as a major food source.

References

External links
 

Thamnophis
Snakes of North America
Reptiles of Canada
Reptiles of Mexico
Reptiles of the United States
Reptiles described in 1853
Taxa named by Spencer Fullerton Baird
Taxa named by Charles Frédéric Girard